Brumby Innes is a 1973 TV film based on the play by Katharine Susannah Prichard.

Original play
Prichard's play had been written in the 1920s. In 1927 it won a competition for best Australian play.

It had been produced in 1972 by The Pram Factory.

References

External links

Brumby Innes Australian theatre productions at AusStage

Australian drama television films
Australian films based on plays
1973 television films
1973 films
1973 drama films
1970s English-language films